Sherlock Holmes and the Leading Lady and its sequel, Incident at Victoria Falls (1992), are a pair of TV films made in 1991 under the banner Sherlock Holmes the Golden Years. Harry Alan Towers was executive producer and Bob Shayne was the writer on both.

Plot
Sherlock Holmes and Doctor Watson are elderly gentlemen in 1910 Vienna. Both are involved independently with foiling Balkan terrorists. They reunite by chance with “The Woman”: actress Irene Adler. They save Emperor Franz Joseph I of Austria from an assassination at the opera house and thus delay the onset of World War I.

The film also featured a number of historical characters, including Eliot Ness and Sigmund Freud.

Cast
 Christopher Lee as Sherlock Holmes
 Patrick Macnee as Dr. Watson
 Morgan Fairchild as Irene Adler
 John Bennett as Dr. Sigmund Freud
 Engelbert Humperdinck as Eberhardt Bohm
 Tom Lahm as Elliott Ness
 Jenny Quayle as Lady Violet Cholmondley
 Jerome Willis as Mycroft Holmes
 Margaret John as Mrs. Hudson
 Charlotte Attenborough as Margaret Froelich

Production
It was initially announced that there would be an eight-hour miniseries entitled The Golden Years of Sherlock Holmes. The project series of eight one-hour episodes soon morphed into two three-hour films.

Filming
It was shot back to back with Incident at Victoria Falls.

Locations
Filming locations were in Austria, London and Luxembourg.

Home media
Both were released in the next two years and there were drastically edited versions released by Vestron Videos. The full versions are now available on DVD.

References

External links

1991 television films
1991 films
Films set in 1910
Films set in Vienna
Films shot in Austria
Films shot in London
Films shot in Luxembourg
Sherlock Holmes and the Leading Lady
Films directed by Peter Sasdy
Cultural depictions of Franz Joseph I of Austria
1990s English-language films